Kazakhstan will be competing at the 2020 Summer Paralympics in Tokyo, Japan, from 24 August to 5 September 2021.

Medalists

Competitors

Athletics

Canoeing

Judo

Shooting

Powerlifting

Swimming 

7 Kazakhstani swimmer has successfully entered the paralympic slot after breaking the MQS.

Taekwondo

Kazakhstan qualified three athletes to compete at the Paralympics competition. Nurlan Dombayev (men's 75 kg) qualified by finishing first at world rankings K43 to booked one ticket. Meanwhile Nyshan Omirali (men's +75 kg) and Kamilya Dosmalova (women's 58 kg) qualified by winning the gold medal at the 2021 Asian Qualification Tournament in Amman, Jordan.

See also
Kazakhstan at the Paralympics
Kazakhstan at the 2020 Summer Olympics

References 

Nations at the 2020 Summer Paralympics
2020
2021 in Kazakhstani sport